Novita Dewi Marpaung (born 15 November 1978) is an Indonesian singer, who gained wide prominence after being the runner-up of the first season of X Factor Indonesia. She is known for her powerful vocals and skilled singing technics. Dewi is the daughter of legendary Batak singer Jack Marpaung. She started her music career in the mid-1990s through various singing competitions and festivals. She was the runner-up of Cipta Pesona Bintang, the weekly champion of Asia Bagus, and the winner of Festival Suara Remaja Vinolia (RCTI). Her highest achievement was as the grand champion of Astana International Song Festival 2005 in Kazakhstan.

Despite her success in festivals, Dewi was still unrecognized in Indonesian music scene. Her debut album, Sweet Heart, was released in 2008, but failed to establish her recording career. She is only recognized to certain community through her Batak-language and religious songs. She released her next pop record, a single entitled "Jejak Luka", under Nagaswara label in 2010. Dewi quit the label and went back to competition by joining the audition of the U.S. version of The X Factor in 2011. She made it to the bootcamp stage, but had to quit the show due to social security.

In late 2012, Dewi auditioned for the premiere of X Factor Indonesia. She was put through to the Gala Live Show under Over 26 category mentored by musician Bebi Romeo. During the show, Dewi was a stable contestant with the most standing ovations from the judges. Anggun once stated that she should have been the rival for the judges, not among the contestants. Dewi advanced to the Grand Final round and finished as the runner-up, with a slight difference of public votes, behind Fatin Shidqia.

In August 2013, Dewi released a cover version of Breakeven with Australian Samantha Jade.

Performances on X Factor Indonesia

Dewi performed the following songs on X Factor Indonesia:

Discography
Sweet Heart (2008)

References

External links
 Novita Dewi on Twitter
 X Factor Indonesia Official website

1978 births
English-language singers from Indonesia
Living people
21st-century Indonesian women singers
Indonesian Christians
People from Jakarta
People of Batak descent
X Factor Indonesia contestants